This is a list of junior high schools in Kanagawa Prefecture.

Municipal

Yokohama

Aoba-ku

 Akanedai (あかね台)
 Aobadai (青葉台)
 Azamino (あざみ野)
 Ichigao (市ケ尾)
 Kamoshida (鴨志田)
 Midorigaoka (緑が丘)
 Mitakedai (みたけ台)
 Moegino (もえぎ野)
 Nara (奈良)
 Susukino (すすき野)
 Utsukushigaoka (美しが丘)
 Yamauchi (山内)
 Yamoto (谷本)

Asahi-ku

Asahi (旭)
Asahi-Kita (旭北)
Honjuku (本宿)
Imajuku (今宿)
Kami-shirane (上白根)
Kibōgaoka (希望が丘)
Makigahara (万騎が原)
Minami-Kibōgaoka (南希望が丘)
Sakon-yama (左近山)
Tsuoka (都岡)
Tsurugamine (鶴ケ峯)
Wakabadai (若葉台)

Hodogaya-ku

Arai (新井)
Hodogaya (保土ケ谷)
Iwaihara (岩井原)
Iwasaki (岩崎)
Kamisugeta (上菅田)
Miyata (宮田)
Nishiya (西谷)
Tachibana (橘)

Isogo-ku

Hama (浜)
Mori (森)
Negishi (根岸)
Okamura (岡村)
Shiomidai (汐見台)
Yōkōdai-Dai-ichi (No. 1) (洋光台第一)
Yōkōdai-Daini (No. 2) (洋光台第二)

Izumi-ku
Combined elementary and junior high schools:
 Ryokuen Gakuen (緑園学園)

Junior high schools:

Izumigaoka (泉が丘)
Izumino (いずみ野)
Kami-Iida (上飯田)
Nakada (中田)
Nakawada (中和田)
Okazu (岡津)
Ryoke (領家)

Kanagawa-ku

Kanagawa (神奈川)
Kuritaya (栗田谷)
Matsumoto (松本)
Nishikidai (錦台)
Rokkakubashi (六角橋)
Sugeta (菅田)
Urashimaoka (浦島丘)

Kanazawa-ku
Nishi Kanazawa Elementary/Junior High School a.k.a. Nishi Kanazawa Gakuen (西金沢学園) is a combined elementary and junior high school in Kanazawa-ku.

Junior high schools:

 Daido (大道)
 Kamariya (釜利谷)
 Kanasawa (金沢)
 Koda (小田)
 Mutsuura (六浦)
 Namiki (並木)
 Nishishiba (西柴)
 Tomioka (富岡)
 Tomioka Higashi (富岡東)

Kohoku-ku

 Hiyoshidai (日吉台)
 Hiyoshidai Nishi (日吉台西)
 Nitta (新田)
 Nippa (新羽)
 Otsuna (大綱)
 Shinohara (篠原)
 Shirosato (城郷)
 Takata (高田)
 Tarumachi (樽町)

Konan-ku

Higashinagaya (東永谷)
Higiriyama (日限山)
Hino-minami (日野南)
Kaminagaya (上永谷)
Kōnan (港南)
Kōnandai-Dai-ichi (No. 1) (港南台第一)
Maruyamadai (丸山台)
Sasage (笹下)
Serigaya (芹が谷)
JHS Attached to Minami HS (南高等学校附属)

Former junior high schools:
Noba (野庭) - Closed in 2020.

Midori-ku
There is a combined elementary and junior high school, Kirigaoka Gakuen (霧が丘学園).

Junior high schools:

 Higashi Kamoi (東鴨居)
 Kamoi (鴨居)
 Nakayama (中山)
 Tana (田奈)
 Tokaichiba (十日市場)

Minami-ku

 Fujinoki (藤の木)
 Heiraku (平楽)
 Kyoshin (共進)
 Maita (蒔田)
 Minami (南)
 Minamigaoka (南が丘)
 Mutsukawa (六ツ川)
 Nagata (永田)

Naka-ku

 Honmoku (本牧)
 Minato (港)
 Nakaodai (仲尾台)
 Otori (大鳥)
 Yokohama Yoshida (横浜吉田)

Nishi-ku

 Karuizawa (軽井沢)
 Nishi (西)
 Oimatsu (老松)
 Okano (岡野)

Sakae-ku

Hongō (本郷)
Iijima (飯島)
Kamigō (上郷)
Katsuradai (桂台)
Koyamadai (小山台)
Nishihongō (西本郷)

Seya-ku

Azumano (東野)
Hara (原)
Minami-seya (南瀬谷)
Seya (瀬谷)
Shimoseya (下瀬谷)

Totsuka-ku

Akiba (秋葉)
Fukaya (深谷)
Gumisawa (汲沢)
Hirado (平戸)
Maioka (舞岡)
Minami-totsuka (南戸塚)
Nase (名瀬)
Sakaigi (境木)
Taishō (大正)
Totsuka (戸塚)
Toyoda (豊田)

Additionally, Ryokuen Gakuen (緑園学園), a combined elementary and junior high school outside of Totsuka-ku, has an attendance zone including parts of Totsuka-ku.

Tsurumi-ku

 Kaminomiya (上の宮)
 Kansei (寛政)
 Ichiba (市場)
 Namamugi (生麦)
 Sueyoshi (末吉)
 Terao (寺尾)
 Tsurumi (鶴見)
 Ushioda (潮田)
 Yakou (矢向)

Tsuzuki-ku

Chigasaki (茅ケ崎)
Edaminami (荏田南)
Hayabuchi (早渕)
Higashi-yamata (東山田)
Kawawa (川和)
Nakagawa (中川)
Nakagawa-nishi (中川西)
Tsuda (都田)

Kawasaki

Asao-ku

 Asao (麻生中学校)
 Haruhino (はるひ野中学校)
 Kakio (柿生中学校)
 Kanahodo (金程中学校)
 Nagasawa (長沢中学校)
 Nishiikuta (西生田中学校)
 Ozenji Chuo (王禅寺中央中学校)
 Shiratori (白鳥中学校)

Former junior high schools:

 Hakusan (白山中学校) - Closed March 31, 2008 (Heisei 20)
 Ozenji (王禅寺中学校) - Closed March 31, 2008 (Heisei 20)

Kawasaki-ku

 Daishi (大師中学校)
 Fujimi (富士見中学校)
 Kawanakajima (川中島中学校)
 Kawasaki JHS (川崎中学校)
 Affiliated Junior High School of Kawasaki HS (川崎高等学校附属中学校)
 Kyomachi (京町中学校)
 Minami Daishi (南大師中学校)
 Rinko (臨港中学校)
 Sakuramoto (桜本中学校)
 Tajima (田島中学校)
 Watarida (渡田中学校)

Miyamae-ku

 Arima (有馬中学校)
 Inukura (犬蔵中学校)
 Miyamaedaira (宮前平中学校)
 Miyazaki (宮崎中学校)
 Mukaigaoka (向丘中学校)
 Nogawa (野川中学校)
 Sugao (菅生中学校)
 Taira (平中学校)

Nakahara-ku

 Gyokusen (玉川中学校)
 Hirama (平間中学校)
 Ida (井田中学校)
 Imai (今井中学校)
 Miyauchi (宮内中学校)
 Nakahara (中原中学校)
 Nishi Nakahara (西中原中学校)
 Sumiyoshi (住吉中学校)

Saiwai-ku

 Hiyoshi (日吉中学校)
 Minamigawara (南河原中学校)
 Minamikase (南加瀬中学校)
 Miyuki (御幸中学校)
 Tsukagoshi (塚越中学校)

Takatsu-ku

 Higashitakatsu (東高津中学校)
 Higashitachibana (東橘中学校)
 Nishitakatsu (西高津中学校)
 Tachibana (橘中学校)
 Takatsu (高津中学校)

Tama-ku

 Ikuta (生田中学校)
 Inada (稲田中学校)
 Masugata (枡形中学校)
 Minamiikuta (南生田中学校)
 Minamisuge (南菅中学校)
 Nakanoshima (中野島中学校)
 Suge (菅中学校)

Sagamihara
Chuo-ku

 Chuo (中央中学校)
 Kamimizo (上溝中学校)
 Kamimizo Minami (上溝南中学校)
 Kyowa (共和中学校)
 Midorigaoka (緑が丘中学校)
 Ono Kita (大野北中学校)
 Oyama (小山中学校)
 Seishin (清新中学校)
 Tana (田名中学校)
 Yaei (弥栄中学校)
 Yoshinodai (由野台中学校)

Midori-ku

 Aihara (相原中学校)
 Asahi (旭中学校)
 Fujino (藤野中学校)
 Hokuso (北相中学校)
 Kushikawa (串川中学校)
 Nakazawa (中沢中学校)
 Nakano (中野中学校)
 Osawa (大沢中学校)
 Sagamigaoka (相模丘中学校)
 Toya (鳥屋中学校)
 Uchide (内出中学校)
 Uchigo (内郷中学校)

Minami-ku

 Asamizodai (麻溝台中学校)
 Kami Tsuruma (上鶴間中学校)
 Onodai (大野台中学校)
 Ono Minami (大野南中学校)
 Sagamidai (相模台中学校)
 Shincho (新町中学校)
 Sobudai (相武台中学校)
 Soyo (相陽中学校)
 Torin (東林中学校)
 Unomori (鵜野森中学校)
 Wakakusa (若草中学校)
 Yaguchi (谷口中学校)

Foreign government-operated
Department of Defense Education Activity (DoDEA) (United States):
 Zama Middle High School - Camp Zama
 Yokosuka Middle School - United States Fleet Activities Yokosuka

Private

 German School of Tokyo Yokohama (junior high division)
 Yokohama International School
 Yokohama Overseas Chinese School
 Yokohama Yamate Chinese School
 Kanagawa Korean Jr./ Sr. High School (神奈川朝鮮中高級学校)
 Horizon Japan International School
 Caritas Girls' Junior and Senior High School

See also
 Lists of schools in Japan
 List of elementary schools in Kanagawa Prefecture

References

Schools in Kanagawa Prefecture
Kanagawa Prefecture